Cherhill White Horse is a hill figure on Cherhill Down, 3.5 miles east of Calne in Wiltshire, England. Dating from the late 18th century, it is the third oldest of several such white horses in Great Britain, with only the Uffington White Horse and the Westbury White Horse being older. The figure is also sometimes called the Oldbury White Horse.

Location
Facing towards the north-east, Cherhill White Horse lies on a steep slope of Cherhill Down, a little below the earthwork known as Oldbury Castle. It can be seen from the A4 road and the nearby village of Cherhill. A good viewpoint is a lay-by alongside the westbound carriageway of the A4 where it passes below the horse. From near here, a footpath climbs the hill towards the horse.

Near the horse is an obelisk called the Lansdowne Monument, visible in some photographs of the White Horse.

Inspiration
The Cherhill horse may have been inspired by the first such Wiltshire horse, that at Westbury, which had just been remodelled. The origins of the Westbury horse are more obscure. Unlike the Uffington White Horse in Oxfordshire (historically Berkshire), which has been shown to date from the Bronze Age, the earliest evidence of the existence of the Westbury horse is in a paper published by the Rev. Francis Wise in 1742. A bold theory for the origin of the first Wiltshire horse is that it commemorates Alfred the Great's victory over Guthrum and the Danes at the Battle of Ethandun, in 878. Another is that it was carved in the early 18th century as a show of loyalty to the new royal house, the House of Hanover, the white horse being a heraldic symbol of the Electorate of Hanover. One writer on the subject has commented "...the hillside white horse can be a slippery creature, and the origins of some are impossible to establish with any certainty."

History

The figure at Cherhill was first cut in 1780 by a Dr Christopher Alsop, of Calne, and was created by stripping away the turf to expose the chalk hillside beneath. Dr Alsop, who was Guild Steward of the Borough of Calne, has been called "the mad doctor", and is reported to have directed the making of the horse from a distance, shouting through a megaphone from below Labour-in-Vain Hill. His design may have been influenced by the work of his artist friend George Stubbs, notable for his paintings of horses.

Since 1780, the horse has been 'scoured' several times. In 1935, it was dressed with a mixture of concrete and chalk, and it was cleaned up in 1994. A major restoration was carried out in 2002 by the Cherhill White Horse Restoration Group, when the horse was resurfaced with one hundred and sixty tonnes of new chalk, the outline was re-cut, and shuttering was added to hold the chalk in place. This work was supported by a grant of £18,000 from the National Trust. The present surface is made of compacted chalk, and the edges of the figure are well defined.

In the 19th century, the horse had a glittering glass eye, formed from bottles pressed neck-first into the ground. The bottles had been added by a Farmer Angell and his wife, but by the late 19th century they had disappeared. During the 1970s, a local youth centre project added a new eye made of glass bottles, but these also disappeared. The eye now consists of stone and concrete and sits at a higher level than that of the chalk surface around it.

In 1922, M. Oldfield Howey noted that "At the time of writing (1922) this horse is sadly in need of scouring, as due to the Great War all such things have had to be neglected, but we understand that a local lady has come to its rescue and asked permission to restore it. Formerly the Lord of the Manor was its groom!"

In the week of the coronation of King George VI and Queen Elizabeth in 1937, the horse was floodlit and the letters GE were picked out in red lights above it, with the power coming from a generator at the foot of the hill. The red letters were lit up for five seconds, followed by the floodlights for ten seconds, in a repeating pattern.

The hill above the horse belongs to the National Trust.

Thirteen such white horses are known to have existed in Wiltshire. Of these, eight can still be seen, while the others have grown over. The Alton Barnes White Horse, at Alton Barnes, is known to be based on Cherhill White Horse.

See also
 Hill figure
 List of hill figures in Wiltshire

 Broad Town White Horse
 Marlborough White Horse
 Litlington White Horse

References

Bibliography
 Plenderleath, Rev. W. C., On the White Horses of Wiltshire and Its Neighbourhood (Wilts Archaeological Magazine, vol. 14 for the year 1872, pp. 12–30)
Plenderleath, Rev. W. C., White Horses of the West of England (London: Alfred Russell Smith, & Calne: Alfred Heath, 1885; 2nd edition, London, Allen & Storr, 1892)
Marples, Morris, White Horses & Other Hill Figures (London: Country Life Ltd, 1949; New York, Charles Scribner's Sons, 1949)
Bergamar, Kate, Discovering Hill Figures (London: Shire Publications, 1968, 4th revised edition 1997)

External pictures and videos
 A Drone Video of Cherhill White Horse and Landsdowne Monument at vimeo.com
Panorama of Cherhill White Horse and Landsdowne Monument at flickr.com
Cherhill White Horse  at bbc.co.uk
Postcard of the Cherhill White Horse, c. 1910 at hows.org.uk
Cherhill White Horse, close up at flickr.com
Cherhill White Horse, very close up at hows.org.uk

External links
Cherhill White Horse location map from maps.yahoo.com
Interactive map of Oldbury Castle and Cherhill White Horse, Wiltshire, from pagemost.com

Geography of Wiltshire
White horses (hill figures) in England
History of Wiltshire
Tourist attractions in Wiltshire
Protected areas of Wiltshire
1780 works